This is a list of active airlines which have an Air Operator Certificate issued by the Civil Aviation Safety Authority Suriname - CASAS of Suriname.

{|  class="wikitable sortable" style="border: 0; cellpadding: 2; cellspacing: 3;"
|- valign="middle"
! Airline
! Image
! IATA
! ICAO
! Callsign
! Hub airport(s)
! class="unsortable"|Notes
|-
|Blue Wing Airlines (BWI)
|
|
|BWI
|BLUETAIL
|Zorg en Hoop Airport
|Domestic airline, commercial
|-
|Fly All Ways (FAW)
|
|8W
|EDR
|BIRDVIEW / FLY ALL WAYS
|Johan Adolf Pengel International Airport
|Regional airline
|- 
|Gum Air (GUM)
|
|
|GUM
|GUMAIR
|Zorg en Hoop Airport
|Domestic airline, commercial
|-
|Surinam Airways (SLM)
|
|PY
|SLM
|SURINAM
|Johan Adolf Pengel International Airport
|National airline, commercial
|-
|}

This is a list of active airlines with a non-commercial Air Operator Certificate issued by the Civil Aviation Safety Authority Suriname - CASAS of Suriname.

{|  class="wikitable sortable" style="border: 0; cellpadding: 2; cellspacing: 3;"
|- valign="middle"
! Airline
! IATA
! ICAO
! Callsign
! Hub Airport(s)
! class="unsortable"|Notes
|-
| (ACS)
|
|
|
|Zorg en Hoop Airport
|Aero Club 
|- 
|Badjas Airlines 
|
|
|
|Johan Adolf Pengel International Airport
|Air cargo
|-
|Coronie Aero Farming (CAF)
|
|
|
|Totness Airstrip
|Air Crop-Dusters
|- 
|Eagle Air Services (EAS)
|
|
|
|Nickerie Major Fernandes Airfield
|Air Crop-Dusters
|- 
|ERK Farms (ERK)
|
|
|
|Nickerie Major Fernandes Airfield
|Air Crop-Dusters
|-
|Overeem Air Service (OAS)
|
|
|
|Wageningen Airstrip
|Air Crop-Dusters
|-
|Pegasus Air Services (PAS)
|
|
|
|Zorg en Hoop Airport
|Helicopter Flightschool Company
|-
|Surinaamse Zendings Vliegdienst / MAF Suriname (MAF)
|
|
|
|Zorg en Hoop Airport
|Missionary Aviation
|-
| (SSF)
|
|
|
|Wageningen Airstrip
|Air Crop-Dusters
|- 
|United Aviation Services (UAS)
|
|
|
|Zorg en Hoop Airport
|Helicopter Service
|- 
|Vortex Aviation Suriname (VAS)
|
|
|
|Zorg en Hoop Airport
|General Aviation Maintenance & Flight School
|-
|}

 See also 
List of defunct airlines of Suriname
List of airlines

References

 
Airlines
Suriname
Airlines
Suriname